George Moses (11 September 1920 – 20 June 1987) was an English footballer who played as an inside-right for Newcastle United and Hartlepools United.

Career
Moses signed with Newcastle United in October 1939. During World War II he played one game as a guest for Port Vale, in a 2–1 defeat to Notts County at Meadow Lane in a Midland Cup, Qualifying Tournament match on 14 April 1945. He joined Hartlepools United in August 1946, and played 19 Third Division North and two FA Cup during the 1946–47 season, scoring four league goals.

Career statistics
Source:

References

1920 births
1987 deaths
People from High Spen
Footballers from Tyne and Wear
Footballers from County Durham
English footballers
Association football inside forwards
Newcastle United F.C. players
Hartlepool United F.C. players
Port Vale F.C. wartime guest players
English Football League players